Al-Musayyib Sport Club, is an Iraqi football team based in Al-Musayab District, Babil, that plays in Iraq Division Two.

Al-Musayyib Sports City Stadium
In the April 2020–21 season, the club's honorary president announced plans to build a sports complex called Al-Musayyib Sports City, which will include an Olympic stadium and swimming pool as well as a multi-purpose gymnasium, 10,000,000,000 IQD have been allocated as a first stage to start.

Managerial history
 Ali Jawad
 Ahmed Hassan Samin
 Ali Ismail
 Mustafa Mohammed Ridha

See also 
 1992–93 Iraq FA Cup
 1998–99 Iraq FA Cup
 2001–02 Iraq FA Cup
 2002–03 Iraq FA Cup
 2020–21 Iraq FA Cup

References

External links
 Al-Musayyib SC on Goalzz.com
 Iraq Clubs- Foundation Dates

1969 establishments in Iraq
Association football clubs established in 1969
Football clubs in Babil